Nakaseke District is a district in Central Uganda. It is named after Nakaseke, the largest town in the district. However, the district headquarters are located at Butalangu.

Location
Nakaseke District is bordered by Nakasongola District to the north and northeast, Luweero District to the southeast, Wakiso District to the south, Mityana District to the southwest. Kiboga District and Kyankwanzi District lie to the west and Masindi District lies to the northwest. The coordinates of the district are:00 44N, 32 25E.

Overview
Nakaseke District is divided into the following administrative units:
1. Kapeeka 2. Ngoma 3. Kinyogoga 4. Wakyaato 5. Nakaseke Town Council 6. Kasangombe 7. Semuto and 8. Kikamulo.

It estimated that 59.2 percent of the Nakaseke District community is literate, which is largely limited to the local Luganda language. A Primary Teachers' Training College has been built in Nakaseke.

Nakaseke District has seven health units including a 100-bed public hospital, Nakaseke Hospital, administered by the Uganda Ministry of Health. Nakaseke Hospital is connected to other health units by a radio. There is also a community hospital at Kiwoko, Kiwoko Hospital, administrated by the Church of Uganda where there are five doctors, six medical assistants, 23 midwives and 33 nurses, as of 2010.

Access to clean water is possible through a network of boreholes and a protected springs. One of the major health concerns is the high prevalence of HIV/AIDS in the district. , the prevalence rate of the disease in the district was estimated at about 8%, compared to the national average of 6.5%. Nakaseke District has the sixth-highest prevalence rate of HIV/AIDS in the entire country's 112 districts.

Population
The 1991 Uganda national census estimated the population of Nakaseke District at about 93,800. The 2002 national census put the district population at about 137,300 inhabitants, with an annual growth rate of 3.3%. In 2012, the population of the district was estimated at approximately 191,100.

Economic activity
Farming is the main economic activity in the districts. Activities include the cultivation of coffee, maize, beans, bananas, cassava, sweet potatoes, vegetables such as tomatoes, cabbage and fruits including pineapples and mangoes. Fishing in the area swamps, raising of cattle (for meat and milk), goats and chicken are some of the activities carried out in the area. About 90 percent of the farmers use traditional farming methods and techniques. The produce finds ready market in Kampala.

See also
Nakaseke
Central Region, Uganda
Nakaseke Hospital
Districts of Uganda

References

External links
 Nakaseke District Homepage

 
Districts of Uganda
Central Region, Uganda
Districts in Uganda